Maryevka is a rural locality (a settlement) and the administrative center of Morozovskoye Rural Settlement, Ertilsky District, Voronezh Oblast, Russia. The population was 215 as of 2010. There are 3 streets.

Geography 
Maryevka is located 14 km northwest of Ertil (the district's administrative centre) by road. Morozovka is the nearest rural locality.

References 

Rural localities in Ertilsky District